Brachyinsara is a genus of phaneropterine katydids in the family Tettigoniidae. There are at least two described species in Brachyinsara.

Species
These two species belong to the genus Brachyinsara:
 Brachyinsara hemiptera Hebard, 1939 (least katydid)
 Brachyinsara magdalenae Rehn & Hebard, 1914

References

Further reading

 

Phaneropterinae
Articles created by Qbugbot